KM3 or Kernel Meta Meta Model is a neutral computer language to write metamodels and to define Domain Specific Languages. KM3 has been defined at INRIA and is available under the Eclipse platform.

References 
                                            
KM3: a DSL for Metamodel Specification Jouault, F, and Bézivin, J (2006). In: Proceedings of 8th IFIP International Conference on Formal Methods for Open Object-Based Distributed Systems, LNCS 4037, Bologna, Italy, pages 171-185. 
ADT Download
Eclipse GMT site
softwarefactories.com article
Softmetaware.com article
uio.no article
softmetaware.com article
trese.cs.utwente.nl présentation
bis.uni-leipzig.de présentation

Related Concepts 
 Model-driven architecture  (MDA is an OMG Trademark),
 Model Driven Engineering   (MDE is not an OMG Trademark)
 Domain Specific Language (DSL)
 Domain-specific modelling (DSM)
 Model-based testing (MBT)
 Meta-modeling
 ATL
 XMI
 OCL
 MTL
 MOF
 Object-oriented analysis and design (OOAD)
 Kermeta

External links
 KM3 @ Eclipse.

Specification languages